Oruanui or Ōruanui is a rural community in the Taupō District and Waikato region of New Zealand's North Island, located northwest of Wairakei on State Highway 1.

The New Zealand Ministry for Culture and Heritage gives a translation of "place of many pits" for Ōruanui.

The local Ōruanui Marae is a meeting place of the Ngāti Tūwharetoa hapū of Ngāti Te Rangiita and Te Kapa o Te Rangiita. It includes the and Te Kapa o te Rangiita meeting house.

Demographics
Oruanui is in two SA1 statistical areas which cover . The SA1 areas are part of the larger Ohakuri statistical area.

The SA1 areas had a population of 366 at the 2018 New Zealand census, an increase of 39 people (11.9%) since the 2013 census, and an increase of 33 people (9.9%) since the 2006 census. There were 141 households, comprising 180 males and 183 females, giving a sex ratio of 0.98 males per female, with 81 people (22.1%) aged under 15 years, 33 (9.0%) aged 15 to 29, 195 (53.3%) aged 30 to 64, and 57 (15.6%) aged 65 or older.

Ethnicities were 93.4% European/Pākehā, 11.5% Māori, 1.6% Pacific peoples, 1.6% Asian, and 0.8% other ethnicities. People may identify with more than one ethnicity.

Although some people chose not to answer the census's question about religious affiliation, 65.6% had no religion, 27.0% were Christian and 1.6% had other religions.

Of those at least 15 years old, 33 (11.6%) people had a bachelor's or higher degree, and 63 (22.1%) people had no formal qualifications. 51 people (17.9%) earned over $70,000 compared to 17.2% nationally. The employment status of those at least 15 was that 156 (54.7%) people were employed full-time, 66 (23.2%) were part-time, and 3 (1.1%) were unemployed.

References

Taupō District
Populated places in Waikato